The 1987 Portuguese motorcycle Grand Prix was the thirteenth round of the 1987 Grand Prix motorcycle racing season. It took place on the weekend of 12–13 September 1987 at the Circuito Permanente Del Jarama.

Classification

500 cc

References

Portuguese motorcycle Grand Prix
Spanish
Motorcycle